Tollefson Nunatak is a nunatak lying 5 nautical miles (9 km) west of Olander Nunatak, being one of several scattered and somewhat isolated nunataks located 40 nautical miles (70 km) north of the Merrick Mountains, in Palmer Land. Mapped by United States Geological Survey (USGS) from surveys and U.S. Navy air photos, 1961–67. Named by Advisory Committee on Antarctic Names (US-ACAN) for T.W. Tollefson, construction electrician at Eights Station in 1963.

Nunataks of Palmer Land